Perakam is a census town in Thrissur district in the Indian state of Kerala.

Demographics
 India census, Perakam had a population of 10,356. Males constitute 47% of the population and females 53%. Perakam has an average literacy rate of 84%, higher than the national average of 59.5%: male literacy is 85%, and female literacy is 84%. In Perakam, 11% of the population is under 6 years of age.

References

Cities and towns in Thrissur district